The Modernize São Vicente Movement is a regional political party in São Vicente, Cabo Verde.

History
In the 2004 local elections the party received 5.4% of the vote in São Vicente. Although it failed to win a seat in the Municipal Council, it won a single seat in the Municipal Assembly, taken by Maria Helena A. Modesto Leite.

References

Political parties in Cape Verde
São Vicente, Cape Verde